Jonathan Kydd is a British actor, narrator, writer, and producer.

His first acting role was in the 1962 British comedy film The Iron Maiden, in which he appeared aged 6 with his father. His father is the actor Sam Kydd who was in over 290 films. He has recently published the first volume of his father’s memoirs ‘Be a Good Boy Sam 1945-52’. His mother, Pinkie, was one of England's first female advertising copywriters and also played table tennis eleven times for England and was World Doubles Finalist in 1949. He has been on many TV shows but has been very successful as a voice over voicing video games, advertisements, corporates, documentaries and cartoons and being a regular on Radio 4 comedy. He was recently an executive producer on the horror film Lair. He has fronted many comedy bands and sings and writes for The Rudy Vees. He podcasts on The Chelsea Fancast every week about Chelsea FC and does the two minute Chelsea Fanbite for the Fancast. He has written 4 musicals. His short film ‘Ahaarrr’ won several awards at many film festivals. His recent video ‘Posh’ a 1930s grime track was described as ‘a bizarrely brilliant work of art’

Career
Jonathan Kydd was the man who had his car buried in the sand in a 1989 AA commercial which ran for four years. He has also appeared in numerous radio and television series including: Pipkins, Chambers, Dial M For Pizza, Flying the Flag, The Quest, Jonathan Creek, Trial and Retribution, The Castle, The Attractive Young Rabbi and Cabin Pressure. He wrote 23 comedy songs for the comedian Brian Conley when he was appearing in his Saturday evening show in the early nineties, one of which was on the 1994 Royal Variety Show. He has written four musicals, one of which, Hey Get a Life, was on at the St Andrews Lane Theatre in Dublin in 2000 which he also directed. His musical The Hard Boiled Egg and the Wasp, about the Victorian comedian Dan Leno, was on at the Lion and Unicorn Theatre in 2012. His later musical, written like the previous one with Andy Street, was Doodle the Musical which was on at Waterloo East; his father Sam Kydd was in it as a character. He appeared on Talking Pictures TV talking about his father on 'Sam Kydd day' when they showed nine of the 290 films made by his father between 1945 and 1982.

He has acted in many sitcoms, including One Foot in the Grave and three series of Smith and Jones as one of the 'pals'. He voiced the cult Ferrero Rocher Ambassador's Reception television advertisement, and featured as the voice of Hagrid, Death Eaters and various wizards in all the Harry Potter computer games. His short film Ahaarrrr (2007) appeared at seventeen international film festivals. His most recent short is Shakespeare's Wart.

He has voiced over 12,000 adverts, promos, documentaries, corporate videos, and CD ROM games, and has dubbed many films and TV programmes. He was the voice for L'Oreal adverts in the early 2000s. He is a regular voice for Film4, and voices many wildlife documentaries. He writes and provides vocals with comedy band The Rudy Vees having been in The Amazing Singing Dentists, The Bay Citee Molars and The Kondos who appeared on the finals of New Faces in 1988, and played in his own band Jonny Kydd, for whom he recorded a song for Chelsea FC called "Chelsea Blue". His album Eggshell Heart was out in 2005. His Bay Citee Molars album Dentura Highway was released in 2009. His Rudy Vees album The Fists of Harmonious Righteousnesswhich is just out has three videos recorded from it: "King of Thongs", "My baby's possibly a Vampire" and "Dance Like My Dad". His new videos are "Posh" and an electro dance track singing the praises of the Speaker of the House of Commons, John Bercow.

From 1997, he was the voice of Paddington Bear in The Adventures of Paddington Bear. Other animated programmes he voiced are: two series of Mr Bean, Warren United, The Big Knights, Hilltop Hospital, the first series of Bimble's Bucket, Asterix, The Bash Street Kids, Bangers and Mash and Astro Farm. He also lent his voice to an animated pilot called Knots in the Wood which was never released. He was also one of the voices on the Lenny the Letter educational videos produced by Royal Mail, dating back to 1991. Every week he talks football on the Chelsea Fancast podcast.

In 2016-18, he voiced Fuse the robot and Big Ears and Scurvy and the Ninjas and Daft Knight in Noddy, Toyland Detective. He voiced various characters in Assassin's Creed Syndicate and Unity. He was also the vocal double for Robbie Coltrane in Harry Potter related media, having voiced Rubeus Hagrid in the various video games related to the series. His first video game was the voice of the Doorbot in the 1998 video game Starship Titanic. He also provided additional voices to other games, such as Call of Duty, Fable, Demon Souls, Crysis, Heavenly Sword, Blitzkreig, Drakengard, Dragon Quest Sword, Hellgate, Dark Seer, The Hobbit, Star Wars, Age of Conan, Medieval 2, Headhunter, etc etc as well as all the Harry Potter games as Peeves and Hagrid and Erklings and Portraits and Deatheaters.

Appearances
The Iron Maiden - (1962) - as Fred's Son (played by real-life Father, Sam Kydd)
Pipkins (70 episodes)
One Foot in the Grave (two characters: Stall holder and Chippy Joe)
Jonathan Creek Mickey Daniels
Holby City
Doctors
Sam Kydd edition of This Is Your Life
The Castle (BBC Radio 4) 4 series.

Voices
The Beano Video - Gnasher, Gnipper, Rasher, Curly, Pie-Face, Dennis' Dad, Walter the Softy, Spotty Perkins, Bertie Blenkinsop, Parrot, Softy Matthew, Flea #1, Fred, Customer, Doctor #1, Neighbour, Man #1, Monkey, Zookeeper, Elephant, Mother Bird, Minnie's Dad, Dogs, Chair Store Man, Frog, Policeman #1, Pilot, Bully, Man on Bench, Men in Tailcoats, Policeman #2, Sergeant, Policemen, Plug, Sidney, Smiffy, Spotty, Winston, Posh Street Kids, Mr. Keeper, Narrator #3, Coyotes, Cuckoo Duck, Boy #1
The Beano Videostars - Gnasher, Gnipper, Walter the Softy (The Snowman Army, Dad commercial and Party Sounds from Beano Town commercial), Colonel, Park Keeper #1, Walter’s Teacher, Minnie's Dad, Park Keeper #2, Plug, Teacher, Headmaster, Mr. School Inspector, Horse Race Announcer, Doctor, Uncle Mike, Billy Whizz, Penguin, Pedestrian #3, Ivy’s Dad, Poolgoer #3, Park Keeper #3, Poolgoer #5, Police Officer #2, Ivy's Toys, Presenter
Dennis and Gnasher - J, Muffin Man

Voiceover in trailers
 VCI - Children's Videos promo (1996 & 1997)

Videos narrated by Jonathan Kydd
Kent Coast
East Coastway and Marshlink
Isle Of Wight 
Cotswolds & Malverns Line by First Great Western
Exeter to Basingstoke by South West Trains
Eurostar Brussels to London St Pancras
Strasbourg to Paris by TGV
Turin to Chambéry by TGV
The Tube

References

External links

http://www.jonathankydd.com/

Living people
20th-century English male actors
21st-century English male actors
English male child actors
English male television actors
English male voice actors
Male actors from London
Year of birth missing (living people)